The 2022 Kelly Cup playoffs of the ECHL hockey league began on April 20, 2022, following the conclusion of the 2021–22 ECHL regular season and ended on June 11 with the Florida Everblades winning their second Kelly Cup over the Toledo Walleye in five games.

Playoff format
The league announced its playoff format on January 21, 2022. At the end of the regular season, the top four teams in each division qualify for the 2022 Kelly Cup playoffs and are seeded one through four based on the highest points percentage earned in the season. Then the first two rounds of the playoffs are held within the division with the first seed facing the fourth seed and the second seed facing the third. The division champions then play each other in a conference championship. The Kelly Cup finals pit the Eastern Conference champion against the Western Conference champion.  All four rounds are a best-of-seven format.

Playoff seeds
After the regular season, 16 teams qualified for the playoffs. The Toledo Walleye were the first team to qualify during the regular season on March 26, with the Reading Royals qualifying shortly after on March 29. Due to the imbalanced scheduling during the pandemic, teams were seeded by points percentage.

Final seeds and points percentages:

Eastern Conference

North Division
Reading Royals – Division champions, .697 pts%
Newfoundland Growlers – .664 pts%
Trois-Rivières Lions – .536 pts%
Maine Mariners – .514 pts%

South Division
Florida Everblades – Division champions, .653 pts%
Atlanta Gladiators – .632 pts%
Jacksonville Icemen – .590 pts%
Greenville Swamp Rabbits – .528 pts%

Western Conference

Central Division
Toledo Walleye – Brabham Cup winners, division champions, .708 pts%
Fort Wayne Komets – .604 pts%
Wheeling Nailers – .542 pts%
Cincinnati Cyclones – .528 pts%

Mountain Division
Utah Grizzlies – Division champions, .604 pts%
Rapid City Rush – .576 pts%
Allen Americans – .549 pts%
Tulsa Oilers – .542 pts%

Playoff bracket

Division semifinals

North Division

(1) Reading Royals vs. (4) Maine Mariners

(2) Newfoundland Growlers vs. (3) Trois-Rivières Lions

South Division

(1) Florida Everblades vs. (4) Greenville Swamp Rabbits

(2) Atlanta Gladiators vs. (3) Jacksonville Icemen

Central Division

(1) Toledo Walleye vs. (4) Cincinnati Cyclones

(2) Fort Wayne Komets vs. (3) Wheeling Nailers

Mountain Division

(1) Utah Grizzlies vs. (4) Tulsa Oilers

(2) Rapid City Rush vs. (3) Allen Americans

Division finals

North Division

(1) Reading Royals vs. (2) Newfoundland Growlers

South Division

(1) Florida Everblades vs. (3) Jacksonville Icemen

Central Division

(1) Toledo Walleye vs. (3) Wheeling Nailers

Mountain Division

(1) Utah Grizzlies vs. (2) Rapid City Rush

Conference finals

Eastern Conference

(N2) Newfoundland Growlers vs. (S1) Florida Everblades

Western Conference

(C1) Toledo Walleye vs. (M1) Utah Grizzlies

Kelly Cup finals

(C1) Toledo Walleye vs. (S1) Florida Everblades

Statistical leaders

Skaters
These are the top ten skaters based on points. 

''GP = Games played; G = Goals; A = Assists; Pts = Points; +/– = Plus/minus; PIM = Penalty minutes

Goaltending

This is a combined table of the top five goaltenders based on goals against average and the top five goaltenders based on save percentage, with at least 300 minutes played. The table is sorted by GAA, and the criteria for inclusion are bolded.

GP = Games played; W = Wins; L = Losses; OTL = Overtime Losses; SA = Shots against; GA = Goals against; GAA = Goals against average; SV% = Save percentage; SO = Shutouts; TOI = Time on ice (in minutes)

See also 
 2021–22 ECHL season
 List of ECHL seasons

References

External links
ECHL website

Kelly
2022